Fillmore — also known as Fillmore: The Last Days, and as Last Days of the Fillmore — is a music documentary film, primarily shot at the Fillmore West auditorium in San Francisco, California, from June 29 through July 4, 1971. It was released on June 14, 1972.

Fillmore documents the final run of concerts at the Fillmore West, which closed after these shows. It features performances by a number of rock bands that emerged from the San Francisco music scene of the late 1960s and early 1970s, including Santana, the Grateful Dead, Jefferson Airplane, Hot Tuna, and Quicksilver Messenger Service. The film also contains extensive footage of concert promoter Bill Graham, who organized the concerts and ran the Fillmore West. Additionally, the film includes documentary footage shot several years earlier in and around San Francisco, showing the emergence of the music scene there amid the counterculture of the 1960s and the hippie movement.

Fillmore was shot on 16 mm film and was released in a widescreen format with a 2.35:1 aspect ratio. It makes frequent use of split screen images.

DVD
Fillmore was released on DVD by Rhino Records on June 2, 2009.  At 94 minutes, the DVD version of the film differs from the original 105 minute theatrical release (released on VHS by All Star Video Corp.), omitting contentious scenes of Bill Graham's interactions with Boz Scaggs, Mike Wilhelm of The Charlatans  and a performance of "I'll Be Long Gone" by Boz Scaggs.

Album
Fillmore: The Last Days, a live album of music selected from the same run of concerts, was released as a three-disc vinyl LP box set in 1972.  It was released as a two-disc CD in 1991. The audio version differs from the film significantly. The original box featured an actual Fillmore ticket, a poster, and a booklet with liner notes, pictures of some concert posters, and a list of all the Fillmore and Fillmore West concerts. Also included in the box is a single with a Bill Graham interview.

Performers
The DVD version of Fillmore includes full or partial performances by these bands, in order of appearance:
Lamb – "Hello Friends", "Isn't It Just a Beautiful Day"
Cold Blood – "You Got Me Hummin'", "Wish I Knew How It Would Feel to Be Free"
Hot Tuna – "Candy Man", "Uncle Sam Blues"
The Rowan Brothers – rehearsal jam
Quicksilver Messenger Service – "Fresh Air", "Mojo"
Jefferson Airplane – "Volunteers", "We Can Be Together" *
New Riders of the Purple Sage – rehearsal jam
Grateful Dead – "Casey Jones", "Johnny B. Goode"
It's a Beautiful Day – "White Bird"
The Elvin Bishop Group – "The Sky Is Crying"
Santana – "Incident at Neshabur", "In a Silent Way"

*Jefferson Airplane did not perform at the final series of concerts at the Fillmore West. The band's footage in the film is from another show.

Concerts
The last concerts to take place at the Fillmore West, in 1971, were:
Tuesday, June 29 – Sawbuck, Malo, Kwane and the Kwanditos
Wednesday, June 30 – Boz Scaggs, Cold Blood, The Flamin' Groovies, Stoneground
Thursday, July 1 – It's a Beautiful Day, The Elvin Bishop Group, Grootna, Lamb
Friday, July 2 – Grateful Dead, New Riders of the Purple Sage, The Rowan Brothers 
Saturday, July 3 – Quicksilver Messenger Service, Hot Tuna, Yogi Phlegm
Sunday, July 4 – Santana, Creedence Clearwater Revival, Tower of Power, various guest musicians

See also
 List of American films of 1972

References

External links

1972 films
American documentary films
Concert films
Rockumentaries
20th Century Fox films
Films directed by Richard T. Heffron
1972 directorial debut films
1970s English-language films
1970s American films